The 1992 Pan Arab Games was the seventh edition of the quadrennial multi-sport event between Arab nations. It was held in Damascus, Syria between September 4 and September 18, 1992. A total of 2611 athletes from 18 countries participated in events in 14 sports.

The event was greatly affected by the 1991 Gulf War, and several players from many arab countries refused to participate in the Games. Iraq and Libya don't took part to the games.

The football tournament was considered also as a part of the Arab Nations Cup.

Sports

Medal table

References

Bell, Daniel (2003). Encyclopedia of International Games. McFarland and Company, Inc. Publishers, Jefferson, North Carolina. .

 
Pan Arab Games
Pan Arab Games
Pan Arab Games
Pan Arab Games
Pan Arab Games, 1992
Multi-sport events in Syria
20th century in Damascus
October 1992 sports events in Asia